is a town located in Sōraku District, Kyoto Prefecture, Japan.

 the town has an estimated population of 1,053. The total area is 23.52 km².

Sights include Kasagiyama Prefectural Natural Park.

Demographics
Per Japanese census data, the population of Kasagi has declined in recent decades.

Kasagidera

 is a Shingon sect Buddhist temple in Kasagi. The Honzon is the bodhisattva Maitreya. The temple is said to have been founded by Emperor Kōbun or Emperor Tenmu. Historically it has had close relations with Tōdai-ji and Kōfuku-ji in Nara. It is an important temple in the history of Buddhism in Japan, and many eminent monks have served as abbot. 
According to legend, the annual Omizutori ceremony at Tōdai-ji was begun by the monk Jitchū after he discovered a passage here that led to the heavenly home of Maitreya.

References

External links

 Kasagi official website 

Towns in Kyoto Prefecture